Wanted is a 1984 Indian Hindi-language action-adventure film directed by Ambrish Sangal, starring Shammi Kapoor, Mithun Chakraborty, Tina Munim in pivotal roles. The film is made in the style of a Spaghetti Western.

Plot
An honest forest officer, Vikram, is in love with Angela, and soon both get married. Their marriage and bliss are shattered when dacait Kehar Singh kills Angela. When Vikram sets out to avenge her death, he himself is framed and sentenced to prison. When he completes his sentence, he comes out only to be a suspect again, this time in the eyes of Neeta, who thinks he killed her dad.

Cast
Shammi Kapoor as Bheem Singh
Mithun Chakraborty as Vikram
Tina Munim as Neeta
Om Shivpuri as Kehar Singh
Mazhar Khan as Nathiya
Mac Mohan as Kehar Singh's Henchman
Krishan Dhawan as Neeta's Father
Asrani as Albert
Deepti Naval as Angela

Music
Lyrics: Anjaan

External links
 

1984 films
1980s Hindi-language films
1984 Western (genre) films
Indian Western (genre) films
Films scored by Bappi Lahiri
Indian action adventure films
1980s action adventure films